Peck Creek flows into the Caroga Creek near Northbush, New York.

References 

Rivers of Fulton County, New York